5 Songs is a promotional EP by the American heavy metal band Iced Earth. Originally released on September 19, 2011, as a part of the October 2011 issue of Rock Hard magazine, the EP contained three live recordings from 2007, an interview, as well as two new songs from the band's then yet-to-be-released tenth studio album Dystopia.

Track listing

† This version of "Anthem" is fifty-two seconds shorter than the one featured on Dystopia.

Personnel

 Iced Earth
On studio tracks
Jon Schaffer – rhythm guitar, lead guitar, backing vocals, co-producer
Stu Block – lead vocals
Troy Seele – lead guitar
Freddie Vidales – bass, backing vocals
Brent Smedley – drums

On live tracks
 Jon Schaffer – rhythm guitar, backing vocals, lead vocals (on "Stormrider")
 Tim "Ripper" Owens - lead vocals
 Troy Seele – lead guitar
 Dennis Hayes - bass
 Brent Smedley – drums

 Other personnel
Jim Morris – co-producer, engineer, mixer, backing vocals (on studio tracks)
Howard Helm – backing vocals (on studio tracks)

References 

2011 EPs
Iced Earth EPs